Meeresstille und Glückliche Fahrt, Op. 112 ("Calm Sea and Prosperous Voyage") is a cantata for chorus and orchestra composed by Ludwig van Beethoven. It is based on a pair of poems by Johann Wolfgang von Goethe. They met in 1812; Beethoven admired him and the work is dedicated to Goethe. It was first performed in Vienna on 25 December 1815, and first published in 1822. The piece is in a single movement, with a typical performance taking between 7 and 8 minutes. The single movement is in two sections: (1) "Meeresstille" – Sostenuto – D major; and (2) "Glückliche Fahrt" – Allegro vivace – D major.

The cantata evokes the imagery of the pair of poems which later inspired the concert overture of the same name by Mendelssohn. The poems' titles are not synonymous: in the days before steam, a totally calm sea was cause for alarm; it is only when the wind at last rises that the ship can continue on its journey. The first section depicts a ship becalmed, the second its success in resuming its voyage.

Text

Instrumentation
The cantata is scored for the following orchestra.

Woodwinds: 2 flutes, 2 oboes, 2 clarinets in A, 2 bassoons
Brass: 4 horns in D, 2 trumpets in D
Percussion: timpani
Strings: violins I & II, violas, cellos, double basses
SATB choir

Selective list of recordings
Michael Tilson Thomas, London Symphony Orchestra and Ambrosian Singers: Beethoven: Late Choral Music, CBS Records, 1975
Claudio Abbado, Vienna Philharmonic and Vienna State Opera: [[Symphony No. 6 (Beethoven)|Beethoven: Symphonie No. 6 'Pastorale''']], Deutsche Grammophon, 1987
Robert Shaw, Atlanta Symphony Orchestra and Chorus: Beethoven: Mass in C, Elegiac Song & Calm Sea and Prosperous Voyage, Telarc, 1990
John Eliot Gardiner, English Baroque Soloists: Messe in C, Archiv, 1992
Matthew Best, Croydon Singers and Croydon Orchestra, Early Cantatas, Hyperion, 1997
Richard Hickox, Collegium Music 90: Mass in C'', Chandos, 2003
Riccardo Muti, Beethoven Lincoln Center, DVD

References

External links

Compositions by Ludwig van Beethoven
Musical settings of poems by Johann Wolfgang von Goethe
1815 compositions
Music with dedications
Cantatas
Compositions in D major